Tecopa (formerly Brownsville) is a census-designated place (CDP) in southeast Inyo County, California, United States. It was established in the late 19th century as mining town. It is now better known for the natural hot springs north of the current townsite.

Tecopa was named after the Paiute leader Chief Tecopa. It was the subject of an important article by John Gregory Dunne published in the Saturday Evening Post and reprinted in Dunne's book, Quintana & Friends, published by Dutton in 1978.

Regional History

The Old Spanish Trail and the later wagon road called the Old Mormon Road or Salt Lake Road, passed from Resting Springs, east of the modern site of  Tecopa, 7 miles to Willow Creek (fed by Willow Spring within China Ranch Wash on the east bank of the canyon of the Amargosa River (then called Saleratus Creek)), south of Tecopa.  In 1859, The Prairie Traveler, a popular handbook for overland travelers at that time described it: 
 
The spring is on the left of the road, and flows into Saleratus Creek.  Animals must not be allowed to drink the Saleratus water." 

There the trail turned to follow the river south to Salt Springs.

China Ranch Wash is named for the Chinese Man who developed Willow Creek around 1900 and raised meat and vegetables to sell to the miners.

History of the Town

Kasson, California was nearby. William D. and Robert D. Brown, brothers, founded the town in 1875, and named it Brownsville. When Jonas Osborne bought out the Browns, he renamed the town after Indian Chief Tecopa. Mines developed at Noonday Mine in the 1860s and Tecopa served as the settlement.    

In 1878, it was determined that the original townsite was 300 yards within  Inyo county. Settling a dispute with San Bernardino County of who controlled the township. however, in July 1879, Inyo County Sheriff William Welch considered it a costly mistake because, "it costs five cents a pound freight from San Bernardino here."

A post office operated at the original site of Tecopa from 1877 to 1881. The town moved to the present location when the Tonopah and Tidewater Railroad, reached the site of the mine smelter on the Amargosa River in 1907. and the townsite moved to be closer to the smelter. A post office opened at the new site in 1907, was closed in 1931, and reopened in 1932.

In 2006 the Amargosa Conservancy acquired the original townsite for preservation purposes

Hot Springs

North of the Post Office is the Hot Springs community, where the Community Center, Fire Station, Library, several tourist facilities and some homes are located.

Tecopa Heights

East of the post office, the General Land Office, then the Bureau of Land Management began offering parcels under the authority of the Small Tract Act of 1938.  Dozens of parcels were claimed and patented in the area now know as "Tecopa Heights."  Most residents of the area live in this area. Southern Inyo County Fire Protection District in 2014 received a grant in order to install a water kiosk for the community, since Tecopa lacks proper water infrastructure that is capable of properly filtering ground water to state standards. The community water kiosk was opened in 2017 on the southeast corner of Tecopa Heights.

Geography
Tecopa is within the Mojave Desert east of Death Valley National Park.

Economy
Historically, Tecopa's economy was based on silver and lead mining, has been slowly transitioning to an ecotourist and resort town. A major attraction in Tecopa is the Tecopa Ecological Reserve, which hosts a natural ground-fed hot spring. However, the natural hot spring is subject to closure because Tourist are being accused of destroying the protected vole habitat with camp fires and human waste

Tecopa also has minimal agriculture activities; mostly revolving around date farming, and marijuana cultivation.

The town has a growing microbrewery and bakery scene that caters to the patrons of Tecopa's three hot springs resorts during the fall and winter seasons.

Arts and culture
Tecopa holds an annual firehouse fling in November. It is hosted by Southern Inyo Fire Protection District, as a way to raise funds for the rural fire department

Demographics

2010
At the 2010 census Tecopa had a population of 150. The population density was 8.0 people per square mile (3.1/km). The racial makeup of Tecopa was 119 (79.3%) White, 1 (0.7%) African American, 8 (5.3%) Native American, 2 (1.3%) Asian, 0 (0.0%) Pacific Islander, 1 (0.7%) from other races, and 19 (12.7%) from two or more races.  Hispanic or Latino of any race were 8 people (5.3%).

The whole population lived in households, no one lived in non-institutionalized group quarters and no one was institutionalized.

There were 92 households, 13 (14.1%) had children under the age of 18 living in them, 22 (23.9%) were opposite-sex married couples living together, 2 (2.2%) had a female householder with no husband present, 6 (6.5%) had a male householder with no wife present.  There were 6 (6.5%) unmarried opposite-sex partnerships, and 2 (2.2%) same-sex married couples or partnerships. 56 households (60.9%) were one person and 28 (30.4%) had someone living alone who was 65 or older. The average household size was 1.63.  There were 30 families (32.6% of households); the average family size was 2.60.

The age distribution was 19 people (12.7%) under the age of 18, 5 people (3.3%) aged 18 to 24, 17 people (11.3%) aged 25 to 44, 59 people (39.3%) aged 45 to 64, and 50 people (33.3%) who were 65 or older.  The median age was 57.5 years. For every 100 females, there were 138.1 males.  For every 100 females age 18 and over, there were 133.9 males.

There were 159 housing units at an average density of 8.5 per square mile (3.3/km),of which 92 were occupied, 57 (62.0%) by the owners and 35 (38.0%) by renters.  The homeowner vacancy rate was 6.6%; the rental vacancy rate was 10.3%.  96 people (64.0% of the population) lived in owner-occupied housing units and 54 people (36.0%) lived in rental housing units.

2000
At the 2000 census there were 99 people, 60 households, and 22 families in the CDP. The population density was 5.3 people per square mile (2.1/km). There were 133 housing units at an average density of 7.2 per square mile (2.8/km).  The racial makeup of the CDP was 88.89% White, 1.01% Black or African American, 7.07% Native American, and 3.03% from two or more races. 4.04% of the population were Hispanic or Latino of any race.
Of the 60 households 10.0% had children under the age of 18 living with them, 28.3% were married couples living together, 6.7% had a female householder with no husband present, and 63.3% were non-families. 55.0% of households were one person and 30.0% were one person aged 65 or older. The average household size was 1.65 and the average family size was 2.50.

The age distribution was 10.1% under the age of 18, 4.0% from 18 to 24, 14.1% from 25 to 44, 28.3% from 45 to 64, and 43.4% 65 or older. The median age was 63 years. For every 100 females, there were 80.0 males. For every 100 females age 18 and over, there were 78.0 males.

The median household income was $12,344 and the median family income  was $16,250. Males had a median income of $0 versus $31,250 for females. The per capita income for the CDP was $10,395. There were 30.8% of families and 38.6% of the population living below the poverty line, including 100.0% of under eighteens and 27.0% of those over 64.

Infrastructure

Transportation
Public transportation in Tecopa is operated by Eastern Sierra Transit Authority as a fixed route lifeline service to residents of Tecopa to Pahrump twice a month. In October 2020, service was suspended because the contractor serving this route, Pahrump Senior Center, sold the route to a third-party vendor and failed to meet contractual obligations. Eastern Sierra Transit Authority is in the process of finding an alternative provider for the Tecopa bus route

Utilities
Tecopa receives electrical power through Southern California Edison. There is no gas utility serving Tecopa. The community instead relies on propane gas deliveries from companies located in Pahrump

The Incumbent telephone carrier for Tecopa is AT&T. The county acknowledges that AT&T fails to maintain their network by providing unreliable Telephone and internet service. The community instead relies on Fixed Wireless Internet Service Providers and Satellite internet

Tecopa doesn't have traditional residential waste services. Instead, residents use communal dumpsters, which are serviced by C&S Waste Solutions under the Pahrump Valley Disposal brand.

Politics and government

Education
Children in Tecopa attend schools operated by Death Valley Unified School District

Library
The Tecopa Branch Library, of the Inyo County Free Library. Provides internet access to community members who lack affordable internet

Public Safety
Law enforcement services to tecopa is provided by the  Inyo County Sheriff’s Office

Fire fighting services is provided by Southern Inyo Fire Protection District, which is headquartered in tecopa.

See also
Lake Tecopa
Tecopa Lake Beds — geologic formation.

References

Census-designated places in Inyo County, California
Populated places in the Mojave Desert
Springs of California
Census-designated places in California
Old Spanish Trail (trade route)
Mormon Road